Newton Airport  was a privately owned, public-use airport three miles south of Newton, in Sussex County, New Jersey. It closed in 2013, after it was purchased for $3.5M by Public Service Electric & Gas Company to be used to stage electrical power equipment used in constructing new transmission lines. FAA removed it from the A/FD and listed it as closed in the June 27, 2013 edition.

Facilities
Newton Airport covered ; its asphalt runway was 6/24 2,546 x 45 ft. In 2008 the airport had 10,695 general aviation operations. 18 aircraft were then based at this airport: 56% ultralight, 39% single-engine and 6% helicopter.

References

External links
 

Defunct airports in New Jersey
Transportation buildings and structures in Sussex County, New Jersey
Newton, New Jersey
2013 disestablishments in New Jersey